The Canada–Colombia Free Trade Agreement  is a trade agreement between the countries of Canada and Colombia.

In August 2002, it was announced that Canada and the Andean Community of Nations—Bolivia, Colombia, Ecuador, and Peru—had agreed to begin preliminary discussions towards a free trade agreement (FTA). Given that not all Andean Community countries were in a position to move forward on FTA negotiations at the same time, Canada worked toward FTAs with Colombia and Peru only as announced in June 2007. The agreement with Colombia was implemented on August 15, 2011.

Canada and Colombia enjoy good commercial and investment relations as the presence of Canadian companies, particularly in the mining, oil exploration, and printing sectors, continues to grow. In 2010 two-way merchandise trade between Canada and Colombia totalled more than $1.4 billion.

Canadian merchandise exports to Colombia totalled $644 million in 2010; major exports include goods such as cereals (wheat, barley), machinery, vegetables (pulses such as lentils, peas, chickpeas), paper and paperboard, and vehicles. Canadian merchandise imports from Colombia totalled $717 million in 2010. Major imports consist of mineral fuels and oils, coffee, fruits, and sugar. As of 2010, the accumulated value of Canadian investment in Colombia was $824 million. This investment is primarily in the oil and gas and mining sectors, although important links also exist in the printing sector.

Overall commerce of FTAs

According to Statistics Canada, this is the 2010 trade balance Canada had with other countries:

References 

Free trade agreements of Canada
Free trade agreements of Colombia
Canada–Colombia relations
Treaties concluded in 2008
Treaties entered into force in 2011